The Truth About Diamonds is a 2005 novel written by Nicole Richie.

Plot
The novel tells the story of Chloe Parker, a woman in her early 20s who had been adopted at the age of seven by a music superstar and his wife, and who now associates with Hollywood celebrities. What had followed was a wild childhood distinguished by parties with movie stars and rock idols, run-ins with the press and the police, and a subsequent stint in rehab.

When Chloe shoots to instant fame as a spokesmodel for a national ad campaign, her long-lost birth father appears out of nowhere, her best friend betrays her, and she has to struggle to keep it all together—her sobriety, her friendships, and her integrity—despite the betrayals of those around her. Ultimately, Chloe comes spectacularly into her own, achieving stardom in her own right and finding true love.

See also
Bright Lights, Big City
Junkie (novel)
Confessions of an English Opium Eater

External links
Sample and audio excerpt (Official publisher web page)

2005 American novels
American autobiographical novels